The 2019 Coppa Italia Final decided the winner of the 2018–19 Coppa Italia, the 72nd season of Italy's main football cup.

It was played on 15 May 2019 at the Stadio Olimpico in Rome between Atalanta and Lazio. This was the first-ever meeting between these two clubs in the final. Lazio won the match 2–0, winning their seventh title overall, from 10 finals appearances. Atalanta made its fourth finals appearance, and have now lost three consecutive finals after winning their only title in 1963.			

As the cup winners, Lazio automatically qualified to the group stage of the 2019–20 UEFA Europa League and to the 2019 Supercoppa Italiana against Juventus.

Road to the final
Note: In all results below, the score of the finalist is given first (H: home; A: away).

Pre-match

Ticketing
Tickets were available for sale only to Italian fans (for security reasons) from 29 April 2019 in three price categories: €35, €50, and €130.

Match

Details

{| width="100%"
|valign="top" width="40%"|

See also

 2018–19 Coppa Italia
 2019–20 UEFA Europa League
 2019 Supercoppa Italiana

References 

Coppa Italia Finals
Coppa Italia Final
Football in Rome
coppa
Coppa Italia Final
Sports competitions in Rome
Coppa Italia Final 2019
Coppa Italia Final 2019